The Association for Women in Sports Media (AWSM)  is an American volunteer-managed, 501(c)(3) nonprofit founded in 1987 as a support network and advocacy group for women who work in sports writing, editing, broadcast and production, and public and media relations. The membership of more than 700 men and women includes professionals in the industry and students aspiring to sports media careers.

AWSM was formed in 1987 by four California sportswriters, Nancy Cooney, Susan Fornoff, Michele Himmelberg and Kristin Huckshorn—to create a strong network and advocacy group for the few women who were working at the time in sports media. Forty people attended AWSM's first annual convention in 1988 in Oakland, California.

15 years prior to the creation of the Association for Women in Sports Media, the Title XI law was put into place. This law stated that discrimination would not be tolerated when it came to access and how women were treated whether playing a sport, or reporting on a sport.

Studies involving members of the Association for Women in Sports Media 
Several studies were conducted, involving members of the Association for Women in Sports Media, such as one conducted by Indiana University students. That study found that majority of the women within the sports field, that were also members of the association felt as though they were treated fairly. The study also concluded that some women still felt as though they were given the short end of the stick when it came to the amount of assignments they received working with male athletes. (Hardin, Marie; Shain, Stacie (2005-12-01).

Another survey of 200 women, also members of the Association for Women in Sports Media was conducted. This survey found that more women working in the sports media field, resulted in women’s sports being broadcast more frequently. The study also concluded that women have grown accustom to males dominating the field, which has helped women accept their role, and strive to do the same work as men. (Smucker, Michael K.; Whisenant, Warren A.; Pedersen, Paul M. (2003-10-01))

70 additional members of the Association for Women in Sports Media was also conducted, finding the women felt as though the pay, assignments given, and treatment by the administration was fair, and they were unable to identify any gaps within the companies they worked for, primarily newspapers. (Miloch, Kimberly S.; Pedersen, Paul M.; Smucker, Michael K.; Whisenant, Warren A. (2005-09-01).

References

External links
Association for Women in Sports Media official website
 An Organization of Their Own
 Women Reporters in the Men's Locker Room
 Melissa Ludtke and Time, Inc., Plaintiffs, v. Bowie Kuhn, Commissioner of Baseball

Sports professional associations based in the United States
American sports journalism organizations
Professional associations for women
Women's sports organizations in the United States
501(c)(3) organizations
Sports organizations established in 1987
1987 establishments in California
Women's sports in California